Agnes of Burgundy (1407 – 1 December 1476), duchess of Bourbon (Bourbonnais) and Auvergne, countess of Clermont, was the daughter of John the Fearless (1371–1419) and Margaret of Bavaria. Her maternal grandparents were Albert I, Duke of Bavaria and Margaret of Brieg. Her paternal grandparents were Philip the Bold and Margaret III, Countess of Flanders.

Marriage and issue
Agnes married Charles I, Duke of Bourbon. They had:
 John of Bourbon (1426–1488), Duke of Bourbon
 Marie de Bourbon  (1428–1448), married in 1444 John II, Duke of Lorraine
 Philip of Bourbon (1430–1440), Lord of Beaujeu
 Charles of Bourbon (Château de Moulins 1434–1488, Lyon), Cardinal and Archbishop of Lyon and Duke of Bourbon
 Isabella of Bourbon (1436–1465), married Charles, Duke of Burgundy.
 Peter of Bourbon, (1438–1503, Château de Moulins), Duke of Bourbon
 Louis of Bourbon (1438 – 30 August 1482, murdered), Prince-Bishop of Liège
 Margaret of Bourbon (5 February 1439 – 1483, Château du Pont-Ains), married in Moulins on 6 April 1472 Philip II, Duke of Savoy, parents of Louise of Savoy
 Catharine of Bourbon (Liège, 1440 – 21 May 1469, Nijmegen), married on 28 December 1463 in Bruges Adolf II, Duke of Guelders
 Joanna of Bourbon (1442–1493, Brussels), married in Brussels in 1467 John II of Chalon, Prince of Orange
 Jacques of Bourbon (1445–1468, Bruges), Count of Montpensier. Unmarried

Notes

References

1407 births
1476 deaths
House of Valois
Duchesses of Bourbon
Burials at Souvigny Priory
15th-century French nobility
15th-century French women
15th-century French people